Ryōki Kawabuchi (川淵 龍起 Kawabuchi Ryōki, May 28, 1860 – February 1, 1941) was mayor of Hiroshima from 1925 to 1929.

1860 births
1941 deaths
Mayors of Hiroshima